Subhash Sudha is an Indian politician. He went to the Haryana Legislative Assembly from Thanesar in the 2019 Haryana Legislative Assembly election as a member of the Bharatiya Janata Party.

References

Living people
Bharatiya Janata Party politicians from Haryana
People from Kurukshetra district
Haryana MLAs 2019–2024
Haryana MLAs 2014–2019
Year of birth missing (living people)